Nadia Sirota (born in New York) is an American viola  player. Her father is Robert Sirota, a composer and conductor.

Life and career

Sirota is best known for her singular sound and expressive execution, coaxing solo works from the likes of Nico Muhly, Daníel Bjarnason, Judd Greenstein, Marcos Balter and Missy Mazzoli. Her debut album First Things First was released in 2009 on New Amsterdam Records and cited as a record of the year by The New York Times, and her second album, Baroque, was released in March 2013. In 2012, she recorded Nico Muhly's "Drones & Piano" with pianist Bruce Brubaker; it appears on the Bedroom Community recording Drones.

In addition to her work as a soloist, Sirota is a member of yMusic, ACME (the American Contemporary Music Ensemble) and Alarm Will Sound, and has lent her sound to recording and concert projects by such artists and songwriters as Grizzly Bear, Dirty Projectors, Jónsi and Arcade Fire. Sirota also hosted a radio show on WQXR's New Music radio stream, Q2Music, for which she was awarded the 2010 ASCAP Deems Taylor Award in Radio and Internet Broadcasting. Sirota is the recipient of Southern Methodist University's 2013 Meadows Prize, awarded to pioneering artists and scholars with an emerging international profile. In 2015, Sirota won a Peabody Award for her work on WQXR's Q2 Music podcast, Meet the Composer, which she co-created and hosted. She received her undergraduate and master's degrees from the Juilliard School, and since 2007 has been on faculty at the Manhattan School of Music in their Contemporary Performance Program.

Since 2018, Sirota has served as the New York Philharmonic’s Creative Partner.

Discography

As leader

As sideman

Notes

References

External links
Nadia Sirota, official website

American violists
Women violists
Year of birth missing (living people)
Living people
My Brightest Diamond members
21st-century classical musicians
21st-century American musicians
21st-century American women musicians
21st-century violists